Stingray is an American drama television series created and produced by Stephen J. Cannell that ran in 23 episodes on NBC from July 14, 1985, to May 8, 1987. It starred Nick Mancuso, who plays the mysterious character known only as Ray, whose trademark is a black 1965 Corvette Sting Ray.

Plot
Ray resides in Southern California. He devotes his time to helping those who are in trouble. His background is shadowy; all that is known about him is that he advertises surreptitiously in newspapers, ostensibly offering a 65 black Stingray, for Barter Only To Right Party" and including a telephone number (555-7687). Those wishing to enlist his services, presumably having learned the ad's real meaning by word of mouth, can call him for help. It is not clear if "Ray" is even his real name, or simply a nickname he has taken on based on the car he drives, the same one described in the advertisement. In the pilot, he does say that it is short for "Raymond", but it never becomes clear if he is being honest or using a cover. In the episode "Sometimes You Gotta Sing the Blues" he identifies himself to police as Charles D. Stroke and invites identification by fingerprint. However, it is not made clear if this is his real name or part of an elaborate cover. In subsequent episodes, the name Charles D. Stroke is not used.

Ray does not charge money for his help. Instead, he requests a favor from his client in advance: the client will repay Ray in the future by performing one service—perhaps easy, perhaps difficult—upon Ray's request, and the request may not be refused. As the series begins, Ray has apparently collected favors from many previous clients. This allows him to call in a variety of favors during the series to help his current clients. For instance, when he poses as a doctor and is called upon to perform surgery, he calls in a favor from a physician client who secretly takes Ray's place in the operating room.

Ray is a skilled driver and accomplished martial artist, and is excellent at covering his tracks and hiding his real identity. On several occasions, clients and government authorities believe that they have discovered who he really is, but in the end they always find that they are mistaken. Often it seems that Ray either is or was affiliated with a secret government agency, perhaps the CIA, but this is never conclusively proven. In "Abnormal Psych" an unnamed opponent with ties to the U.S. intelligence community claims to have "created" Ray, and in "Anytime, Anywhere" it is clear that he served in Vietnam in some capacity. Whenever the license plate for his Stingray is run through a computer, it lists many different addresses and owners. Two of the most notable were "1600 Pennsylvania Ave., Washington, DC" (the address of the White House) and the motor pool for the Governor of California.

Ray's other talents include a photographic memory, speed reading, the ability to slow down his heart to barely perceptible levels, and a knack for adopting personas including an arrogant surgeon, a tent-revival preacher, a crippled Vietnam veteran, and a grieving husband. He is a skilled computer hacker, capable of accessing and altering data systems and coordinating information retrieval.

Production
The 1986 8-episode first season of Stingray was filmed in Southern California.  Later that year, with a favorable exchange rate between the US and Canadian dollars being a win/win for US producers, series creator, Stephen J. Cannell, upon advice from series leading man Nick Mancuso, decided to shoot the second season of the series in Toronto. However, so many producers were shooting in Toronto that no crews were available to man any additional productions. Consequently, Cannell shot the first seven episodes of Stingray's second season in Calgary instead with the remaining eight episodes being shot in Vancouver.

Music
Music, by veteran TV composers Mike Post, Pete Carpenter, and Walter Murphy, long-time collaborators with Cannell, played a large part in the series. In addition to frequent quick-cutting of visuals in time with the incidental music, the show also inserted music video style interludes, complete with original, script-specific "pop songs" written by Stephen Geyer (co-writer "Theme for The Greatest American Hero", "Theme for Hardcastle & McCormick", "Theme for Blossom", etc.) and Post, and sung by (usually) semi-obscure pop and rock vocalists (for example, David Pack singing "Signs of Human Error" in the episode "Playback").  Notable vocalists include José Feliciano, Richie Havens, Taj Mahal, Timothy B. Schmit, Jennifer Warnes.

Uniquely, the end credits featured still photos of the production crew working on the episode.

In the episode, Sometimes You Gotta' Sing The Blues, a song of same title was sung by Lois Blaisch, but the song was never released publicly.

Guest stars
Notable guest stars included Rachel Ticotin, Ray Wise, Mark-Paul Gosselaar, Patricia Wettig, Tom Atkins, Kurtwood Smith, Robert Vaughn, Stuart Pankin, Steven Williams, Marcia Strassman, Eugene Roche, Gregg Henry, Lori Petty, Samantha Eggar, Jeff Altman, Shannon Tweed, Dennis Christopher, Doug Savant, Jeff Conaway, Gregory Sierra, Joseph Ruskin, Kareem Abdul-Jabbar, John Amos, and Clyde Kusatsu.

Awards and nominations
The series won the Primetime Emmy Award in 1986 in category "Outstanding Graphic and Title Design" (Betty Green, graphic design) and was nominated in 1987 in the category "Outstanding Sound Editing for a Series" for the episode "Gemini".

Episodes

Pilot (1985)

Season 1 (1986)

Season 2 (1987)

Home media
On April 1, 2008, Visual Entertainment released the complete series  of Stingray on DVD in Canada.

On January 18, 2011, Mill Creek Entertainment released the complete series on DVD in Region 1 in a five-disc set.

See also 
 The A-Team television series about a team of former military personnel who help those in need.
 Burn Notice
 Cobra
 The Equalizer
 Man in a Suitcase
 Person of Interest
 T.H.E. Cat—a forerunner of the "expert(s) help(s) people in trouble" genre
 Vengeance Unlimited

References

External links
 
 

1980s American drama television series
1985 American television series debuts
1987 American television series endings
Fictional vigilantes
NBC original programming
Television series by Stephen J. Cannell Productions
Television series by Universal Television
Television shows filmed in Vancouver
Television shows filmed in Calgary
Television series created by Stephen J. Cannell
Vigilante television series